The ECW/FMW Supershow was a professional wrestling event jointly promoted by the Japan promotion Frontier Martial-Arts Wrestling (FMW) and the United States-based promotion Extreme Championship Wrestling (ECW) at Korakuen Hall in Tokyo, Japan on December 12 and 13, 1998. 

Both shows aired live on pay-per-view (PPV) in Japan via DirecTV. Excerpts from the December 13 show aired on episode #295 of the syndicated television show ECW Hardcore TV in the United States on December 16, 1998. The December 13 show was also released on DVD.

Background 
The shows formed part of FMW's December 1998 "Year End Sensation" tour. The event featured several matches from FMW's "Over the Top" tournament, which was held to determine the number one contender for the FMW Brass Knuckles Heavyweight Championship and the FMW Independent Heavyweight Championship. 

In a continuation of the working relationship between Frontier Martial-Arts Wrestling and Extreme Championship Wrestling, ECW promoter Paul Heyman sent eight members of the ECW roster to the December 12 and 13, 1998 FMW shows. During their visit, the ECW personnel visited the Ribera Steakhouse, a popular eatery amongst professional wrestlers. On December 11, Sabu attended a retirement ceremony for his uncle, the Sheik, held by Atsushi Onita in Korakuen Hall. On December 12, Sabu and his wife Mibu held a traditional Japanese wedding ceremony.

December 12, 1998

Event 
The first show of the event was held on December 12, 1998 in Korakuen Hall in Tokyo, Japan. It was attended by 2,150 people.

The opening bout was a singles match between Team No Respect stablemates Hido and Takeshi Ono to determine who would advance past the first round of the Over the Top tournament. The match was won by Hido, who pinned Ono using a small package.

The second bout was a singles match between Masao Orihara and Ricky Fuji to determine who would advance past the first round of the Over the Top tournament. The match was won by Orihara, who pinned Ono using a small package.

The third bout was a three way dance between Hisakatsu Oya, Super Leather, and Yoshinori Sasaki. The match was won by Oya, who first eliminated Super Leather by throwing him over the top rope, then eliminated Sasaki by forcing him to submit using an octopus hold.

The fourth bout was a singles match between Kodo Fuyuki and Muhammad Yone, with Fuyuki pinning Yone following a lariat.

The fifth bout saw ECW World Tag Team Champions the Dudley Boyz defend their titles against Gosaku Goshogawara and Tetsuhiro Kuroda. The match was won by the Dudley Boyz, with D-Von Dudley pinning Goshogawara following a 3D.

The sixth bout was a singles match between Hideki Hosaka and Yukihiro Kanemura to determine who would advance past the first round of the Over the Top tournament. The match was won by Kanemura, who pinned Hosaka following a Blast Yama Special.

The seventh bout was a singles match between Koji Nakagawa and Mr. Gannosuke to determine who would advance past the first round of the Over the Top tournament. The match was won by Mr. Gannosuke, who forced Nakagawa to submit using his Nirvana Strangle (a full nelson camel clutch).

The eighth bout saw ECW World Heavyweight Championship Shane Douglas defend his title against Gedo. The match was won by Douglas, who pinned Gedo following a Pittsburgh Plunge.

The main event was a tag team match pitting Hayabusa and Tommy Dreamer against Rob Van Dam and Sabu. The match was won by Sabu and Van Dam, with Van Dam pinning Dreamer with a diving crossbody.

Results

December 13, 1998

Event 
The second and final show of the event was held on December 13, 1998 in Korakuen Hall in Tokyo, Japan. It was attended by 2,150 people. The commentators for the pay-per-view broadcast in Japan were Go Ito, Jado, Jtarô Sugisaku, and Takashi Saito; Joey Styles provided English language commentary on the ECW Hardcore TV broadcast in post-production.

The opening bout was a singles match between Muhammad Yone and Tetsuhiro Kuroda to determine who would advance past the quarter finals of the Over the Top tournament. The match was won by Kuroda, who pinned Yone following a lariat.

The second bout was a singles match between Hido and Masao Orihara to determine who would advance past the quarter finals of the Over the Top tournament. The match was won by Hido when Orihara was disqualified.

The third bout was a singles match between Mr. Gannosuke and Yukihiro Kanemura to determine who would advance past the quarter finals of the Over the Top tournament. The match was won by Mr. Gannosuke, who pinned Kanemura following Fire Thunder.

The fourth bout was a singles match between Hayabusa and Hisakatsu Oya to determine who would advance past the quarter finals of the Over the Top tournament. The match was won by Oya, who forced Hayabusa to submit using an octopus hold.

The fifth bout was a six-man tag team match pitting Flying Kid Ichihara, Ricky Fuji, and Super Leather against  Team No Respect. Team No Respect won the bout when Kodo Fuyuki pinned Ichihara following a lariat.

The sixth bout saw ECW World Heavyweight Champion Shane Douglas defend his title against Tommy Dreamer. Douglas defeated Dreamer by pinfall following a Pittsburgh Plunge.

The seventh bout saw ECW World Tag Team Champions the Dudley Boyz defend their titles against Rob Van Dam and Sabu. Sabu and Van Dam defeated the Dudley Boyz by pinfall after Van Dam drove a chair into Buh Buh Ray Dudley's face with a Van Daminator, thus becoming the new ECW World Tag Team Champions.

The eighth bout (which was not included on the pay-per-view broadcast) was a singles match between Hido and Mr. Gannosuke to determine who would advance past the quarter finals of the Over the Top tournament. The match was won by Mr. Gannosuke, who forced Hido to submit using the Nirvana Strangle (a full nelson camel clutch).

The ninth bout (which was not included on the pay-per-view broadcast) was a singles match between Hisakatsu Oya and Tetsuhiro Kuroda to determine who would advance past the quarter finals of the Over the Top tournament. The match was won by Oya, who pinned Kuroda using a bridging German suplex.

Results

Tournament brackets 
Four matches of the first round and the entirety of the quarter-final and semi-final rounds of the Over the Top tournament to determine the number one contender for the FMW Brass Knuckles Heavyweight Championship and the FMW Independent Heavyweight Championship were held at the ECW/FMW Supershow.

References 

1998 in Japan
1998 in professional wrestling
1998 Extreme Championship Wrestling pay-per-view events
December 1998 events in Asia
Extreme Championship Wrestling supercards and pay-per-view events
Events in Tokyo
Frontier Martial-Arts Wrestling shows
Professional wrestling in Tokyo
Professional wrestling joint events